The Cedar Key Scrub State Reserve is a Florida State Park, located six miles (10 km) northeast of Cedar Key on State Road 24.

Admission and Hours
There is no entrance charge. Florida state parks are open between 8 a.m. and sundown every day of the year (including holidays).

Gallery

External links
 Cedar Key Scrub State Reserve at Florida State Parks
 Cedar Key Scrub State Reserve at State Parks
 Cedar Key Scrub State Reserve at Wildernet

State parks of Florida
Parks in Levy County, Florida
Cedar Key, Florida